Albanian Democratic Monarchist Movement Party is a political party in Albania led by Guri Durollari. The party contested the 2005 parliamentary elections, and got around 0.1% of the votes.

See also 
Legality Movement Party

References 

Monarchist parties in Albania
Political parties in Albania